The 2010–11 Indian cricket season was from late September 2010 to March 2011.

Overview

International Cricket

Australia in India

New Zealand in India

West Indies women in India

World Cup

India Co-hosted the 2011 ICC Cricket world cup with Bangladesh and Sri Lanka.

Warm-up matches

Group stage

Group A

Group B

Knockout

References 

Indian cricket seasons from 2000–01
2010 in Indian cricket
2011 in Indian cricket